The 2022-2023 Pakistan political unrest or Haqeeqi-Azaadi (True Independence) is an ongoing movement headed by former Prime Minister Imran Khan following his ousting through a no confidence motion in April 2022.   In 2022, the Pakistani political crises began when the opposition joined hands and submitted a no-confidence motion against Imran Khan's government in the National Assembly. Prime Minister Imran Khan urged Pakistani establishment not to stay neutral  and play it's role to save his government and not let historical rival politicians with alleged corruption charges take over but the establishment refused thus initiating rivalry against powerful Pakistani establishment that has been happening for the last 11 months. Since his oust Imran Khan has called for early general elections which recently escalated after Khan-led PTI dissolved two of it's provincial assemblies(Punjab and KP) triggering elections in 60% of country due in April 30, 2023 and May 28, 2023 respectively.

References